The 3rd Macau International Movie Festival ceremony, organized by the Macau Film and Television Media Association and China International Cultural Communication Center, honored the best films of 2011 in the Greater China Region and took place on  December 7, 2011, at the Venetian Macao, in Macau.

The Woman Knight of Mirror Lake and The Lost Bladesman won three awards each, with the latter film winning Best Picture.

Winners and nominees

References

External links

Golden Lotus Awards
Macau
2011 in Macau
Gold